Silje Opseth (born 28 April 1999) is a Norwegian ski jumper, who represents the club Holeværingen IL.

She competed at the FIS Nordic World Ski Championships 2017 in Lahti, Finland. Competing at the 2018 Winter Olympics, she placed 16th in the women's normal hill individual.

World Cup

Standings

Individual wins

References

External links
 
 
 
 

1999 births
Living people
Norwegian female ski jumpers
People from Buskerud
Ski jumpers at the 2018 Winter Olympics
Ski jumpers at the 2022 Winter Olympics
Olympic ski jumpers of Norway
FIS Nordic World Ski Championships medalists in ski jumping
Sportspeople from Viken (county)
21st-century Norwegian women